Emeric Salmon (born 26 November, 1973) is a French politician of the National Rally and a member of the National Assembly for Haute-Saône's 2nd constituency since 2022.

Biography
Salmon was born in Vannes in 1973 to a family of six children. His father was an architect. Salmon studied computer science at the University of Rennes I and worked as a software developer.

He became active in politics as a teenager when he voted No in the 1992 French Maastricht Treaty referendum. He joined the National Front (now National Rally) in 2004 and served as a regional councilor in Brittany from 2015 to 2021. 

During the 2017 French legislative election he contested Ille-et-Vilaine's 1st constituency but was eliminated in the first round. During the 2022 French legislative election he was selected to run in Haute-Saône's 2nd constituency for the National Rally and defeated Christophe Lejeune.

See also 

 List of deputies of the 16th National Assembly of France

References 

Living people
1973 births
Deputies of the 16th National Assembly of the French Fifth Republic
21st-century French politicians
National Rally (France) politicians

People from Vannes